Within Y is a Swedish melodic death metal band from Gothenburg. They are currently signed to Gain Music Entertainment.

Band members
Current members
Andreas Solveström – vocals (2002–present)
Mikael Nordin - guitar (2002–present)
Niknam Moslehi - guitar (2004–present)
Jonas Larsson - bass guitar (2006–present)
Erik Hagström - drums (2007–present)

Former members
Niklas Almén - guitar (2002-2004)
Matte Wänerstam - bass guitar (2002-2006)
Thim Blom – drums (2002-2007)

Discography
 Feeble and Weak (Demo) (2002)
 Extended Mental Dimensions (2004)
 Demo 05 (Demo) (2005)
 Portraying Dead Dreams (2006)
 The Cult (2008)
 Silence Conquers (2011)

Swedish melodic death metal musical groups
Musical groups established in 2002
Musical groups from Gothenburg